Marcel Troupel (6 May 1930 – 27 September 2019) was a French sailor who competed in the 1972 Summer Olympics.

References

External links
 
 
 

1930 births
2019 deaths
French male sailors (sport)
Olympic sailors of France
Sailors at the 1972 Summer Olympics – Tempest